Wentorf may refer to the following municipalities in Germany:

Wentorf bei Hamburg, in the district of Lauenburg, Schleswig-Holstein
Wentorf, Sandesneben, part of the Amt Sandesneben, in the district of Lauenburg, Schleswig-Holstein

People with the surname Wentorf:
Carl Wentorf (1863–1914), Danish painter
Robert H. Wentorf, Jr., American scientist